Passions is an American television soap opera that originally aired on NBC from July 5, 1999, to September 7, 2007, and on DirecTV's The 101 Network from September 17, 2007, to August 7, 2008. Created by screenwriter James E. Reilly and produced by NBC Studios, Passions follows the lives, loves and various romantic and paranormal adventures of the residents of Harmony, a small town in New England with many secrets.

Storylines center on the interactions among members of its multi-racial core families: the African American Russells, the white Cranes and Bennetts, and half-Mexican half-Irish Lopez-Fitzgeralds. The series also features supernatural elements, which focus mainly on town witch Tabitha Lenox (Juliet Mills) and her doll-come-to life, Timmy (Josh Ryan Evans).

NBC cancelled Passions on January 16, 2007. The series was subsequently picked up by DirecTV. The series aired its final episode on NBC on September 7, 2007, with new episodes continuing on DirectTV's 101 Network starting on September 17. In December 2007, just months after picking up the series, DirecTV decided not to renew its contract for Passions, and the studio was subsequently unable to sell the series elsewhere. The final episode was broadcast in August 2008. As of 2021, Passions is the last daytime television soap opera created for American network television.

Series history
Passions debuted on NBC broadcast television in July 1999 with major fanfare. Creator Reilly had been credited for a large surge in the ratings for Days of Our Lives years before, thanks to innovative storylines like that of heroine Dr. Marlena Evans being possessed by Satan that drew new viewers, but also tended to alienate stalwart fans. With Passions, Reilly was able to start with a blank slate and no pre-existing fan base to please. The series replaced the Procter & Gamble-produced serial Another World, which ended a 35-year run on June 25, 1999, on NBC's daytime schedule.  In the early days of the show, Passions heroine Sheridan Crane is identified as a close friend of Diana, Princess of Wales; soon Sheridan recalls speaking to Diana on the phone immediately before the 1997 car accident in which Diana was killed. Sheridan also has a similar accident in the same Paris tunnel, and speaks to a "guardian Angel Diana" who urges her to fight to survive, which drew considerable controversy. Sheridan later adopts the name Diana after a boating accident that results in amnesia.

The opening days of the show also introduced the Theresa/Ethan/Gwen love triangle that persisted as an ongoing main story line to the very last episode of the series.

For much of the first three to four years of the series, supernatural elements such as witches, warlocks, and closet doors leading to Hell were major plot points, many surrounding the machinations of the centuries-old witch Tabitha Lenox and her doll-brought-to-life sidekick, Timmy — named by Entertainment Weekly as one of their "17 Great Soap Supercouples" in 2008. In 2001, HarperEntertainment released Hidden Passions, a tie-in novelization presented as Tabitha's diary, exposing the secrets and pasts of the town's residents. Passions featured a story-line involving Tabitha and Timmy promoting the book, which reached #4 on the real-life New York Times Best Seller list and garnered the series two alternative covers of TV Guide in July 2001.

In 2003, Passions submitted an orangutan named BamBam, who had been portraying the recurring role of Precious, for a Daytime Emmy Award. Precious was the non-speaking live-in nurse and caregiver for elderly Edna Wallace, and held an unrequited love for Luis Lopez-Fitzgerald, which was depicted in elaborate fantasy sequences. In early 2004, the National Academy of Television Arts and Sciences, which administers the awards, disallowed the entry with the following statement:
Our ruling is based on the belief that the Academy must draw a line of distinction between animal characters that aren't capable of speaking parts and human actors whose personal interpretation in character portrayal creates nuance and audience engagement that uniquely qualifies those performers for consideration of television's highest honor.

In summer 2005, the prominent character Simone Russell came out as gay; Passions made daytime history by being the first serial to show two women — Simone and love interest Rae Thomas — in bed making love. In 2007, it was revealed that longtime hero Chad Harris-Crane was cheating on his wife with another man. This was also a daytime first, with the men portrayed in bed together, committing -albeit unknowingly- incest. Passions also portrayed Vincent as an intersex person who became pregnant with his own father's son.

Nearly seven years after the debut of Passions on July 5, 1999, the NBC-owned Sci Fi Channel began airing the series from its first episode starting February 13, 2006. Due to low ratings, the reruns were taken off the air as of May 25, 2006.  On August 15, 2006, Passions became the first daytime drama to make full episodes available for download and purchase from the online music store iTunes. On November 6, 2006, the show also became the first daytime drama to make full episodes available for free viewing via streaming on NBC.com.

Though plagued since its inception by low overall Nielsen ratings, Passions was historically top-rated in key demographics, namely the female 12–17 demographic; Passions and Days of Our Lives usually occupied the top two positions among all soaps in this age group.

Move to DirecTV
The series was not renewed by NBC for a full ninth season in 2007, with NBC instead deciding to extend its morning news and talk show Today to a fourth hour. NBC began shopping the series to other networks. In April 2007, paid subscription service satellite provider DirecTV bought exclusive broadcasting rights from NBC to continue airing Passions, with most principal cast members staying on. As the series was coming to an end on NBC, the Passions Live talk show hosted by Eric Martsolf premiered in August 2007 every Thursday night on original-programming channel The 101, giving fans the chance to telephone the show and interact live with Passions cast members, making Passions the first and only soap opera to ever have a live talk show in U.S. history. Passions Live continued to air on Thursday nights after the series moved to DirecTV, until October 2007. The live show was also streaming live on the official Passions website at NBC.com. Passions ended its NBC run on September 7, 2007, and new episodes began airing on The 101 on September 17, 2007. The series ran Monday to Thursday at 2:00 pm ET/11 am PT on DirecTV, with repeats airing later in the day and on weekends. NBC.com continued to maintain Passions official website after the series move from NBC to DirecTV, however new episodes were no longer available at NBC.com for free streaming or for purchase at iTunes. Initially, the new episodes were only supposed to be exclusively available on DirecTV after NBC ended its broadcast to the series, however on September 27, 2007, DirecTV announced they would provide an "All Access Pass to Passions" to view all new episodes at NBC.com for a monthly fee as an alternative for the viewers who were unable to subscribe to DirecTV to continue watching the series after moving from NBC to DirecTV. This service began on October 1, 2007 for $19.99 a month then reduced to $14.99 a month when Passions schedule was cut from four episodes a week to three episodes a week. After the series moved to DirecTV, the subscription service added a special feature where a trivia question relating to Passions would pop up, on each episode airing on The 101, for viewers to use their remote control to answer. Passions was the first soap opera to ever have this type of feature.

On December 10, 2007, Variety magazine and various cast members confirmed that DirecTV had decided not to renew Passions for another year, but ordered 52 additional episodes to be taped through March 2008. New episodes of the series were broadcast until August 7, 2008, with DirecTV airing three new episodes per week starting January 2008. Universal Media Studios wrapped up production of Passions on March 28, 2008. The cast and crew were told at the wrap party that efforts to find a new outlet had failed and that the cancellation was final. Cast member McKenzie Westmore confirmed the news. Though Passions had been the highest-rated original program on DirecTV's The 101, it was reported that the network had failed to meet the projected number of new subscribers they had hoped to attract with the series.

Hallmarks

Pop culture homages
Over its run, Passions featured several storylines and sequences paying homage to or parodying other television series, films, books, and musicals like Gone with the Wind, Carrie, Titanic, I Dream of Jeannie, Brokeback Mountain, Alice's Adventures in Wonderland, Pirates of the Caribbean, The Wizard of Oz, The Da Vinci Code, The Little Mermaid, and Wicked. A 2003 fantasy sequence imitated the "Cell Block Tango" number from the 2002 film Chicago; Passions version of the song, "I Ain't Sorry", received a 2004 Daytime Emmy Award for Outstanding Original Song. A 2006 Bollywood homage featured the song "Love is Ecstasy," which earned the show another Daytime Emmy for Outstanding Original Song and was made available on the NBC website. In nods to Bewitched, Bernard Fox appeared as that series' "Dr. Bombay" twice on Passions in scenes with Tabitha (not to be confused with  own Tabitha Stephens). When Passions Tabitha has a child in 2003, she names the baby "Endora"  which was Tabitha's grandmother's name, and later notes that her parents had been "Samantha" and a mortal named "Darrin."

Dream sequences and flashbacks
One of Passions most notorious trademarks is the false "dream sequence" or fakeout. Often, the show would play out an outlandish event, or explode a huge secret which viewers have long been waiting to see, only to reveal it to be a daydream. This dream sequence would last anywhere from a few scenes to a few episodes, typically beginning without warning. On Passions, often a dream sequence would begin with no visual cues of any sort whatsoever, often going as far as to include contradictory elements to give the dream sequence credence (for instance, another character may show up within the dream wearing an outfit, or revealing information that the daydreamer had no possible way of knowing about beforehand).

Characters on the show have flashbacks to earlier events quite often, so much so that a significant portion of an episode may be repeated scenes.

Fate and destined couples
Another trademark of the serial is its pre-occupation with the concepts of fate and soulmates. For the run of the series, the show established a few couples as "fated" and, with few short-lived exceptions, never mixed up any of the relationships. Some of the early "fated" couples were considered to be those of Luis and Sheridan, Ethan and Theresa, Miguel and Charity, and Chad and Whitney. Common indications of a couple's status as "fated" include (but are not necessarily limited to) Tabitha's desire to split said couple up, an unshakeable love that survives numerous break-ups and relationships with third parties, and/or an ability of one character, or perhaps both characters, to "sense" when his/her "soulmate" is in danger, as well as having shared past lives together in the case of Luis and Sheridan. However, despite the fact that each of these couples has existed as a storyline since the first episodes, the show seems to have given up on the "fated" angle as it approached its end. Ethan and Theresa are still in love and marry in the final episode, but Miguel is now in love with and marries Kay, Luis falls in love with and marries Sheridan's niece Fancy, while Sheridan's formerly presumed dead husband Antonio returns to Harmony alive and well. Whitney left Chad after finding out about his affair with Vincent, and Chad later was shot dead by his father Alistair, leaving Whitney widowed and pregnant.

Summertime extravaganzas
Likely due to Passions school-aged target audience, the show often presented large, wild storylines for the summer, which often took place outside of Harmony. In 1999, a carnival came to town as characters were introduced; 2000 saw the Prom Boat Disaster storyline and 2001 witnessed the failed double-wedding of popular couples Luis and Sheridan and Ethan and Theresa, and their subsequent journey to Bermuda, where Sheridan apparently perished in a boat explosion and Theresa wound up married to Ethan's ex-stepfather, Julian Crane. In 2002, Julian and Timmy set out on a journey in the magical land of Oz as Theresa was "executed" for Julian's "murder"; 2003 saw six characters (Chad, Whitney, Fox, Theresa, Ethan, and Gwen) travel to Los Angeles for the summer (and into October), while, in 2004, Luis and Sheridan traveled to Puerto Arena, Mexico, to retrieve his younger sister, Paloma (and ended up finding his missing father, Martin, and her "dead" mother, Katherine). The plot of the summer in 2005 was a deadly earthquake and tsunami, which destroyed much of Harmony and resulted in the death of James' mother, Maureen, while 2006 saw the extravagant Passions Vendetta plot, in which Alistair lured 19 people (Whitney, Simone, Paloma, Chad, Ethan, Theresa, Gwen, Lena, Spike, Jessica, Maya, Noah, Esmé, Fancy, Luis, Edna Wallace, Norma Bates, Beth, and Marty) to Rome, where he planned to take over the world with a chalice stolen from the Pope's private chambers; the plot saw the death of Lena, Maya, Alistair, Beth, and Marty.  Summer 2007 saw the resolution of the "blackmailer" storyline as Vincent Clarkson was revealed to be the half-man/half-woman blackmailer, and Luis Lopez-Fitzgerald was saved from execution for Vincent's crimes by Endora's spell that turned back time in the execution chamber. In 2008, the show spent its final summer on the air wrapping up its plotlines at a rapid pace, with Alistair Crane being killed once and for all, the final showdowns between the main characters and the newly introduced villains Viki, Juanita, Pretty, and Vincent, Tabitha's redemption as a born again Christian who sacrifices her powers to save the residents of Harmony, the return of Antonio and his reunion with Sheridan, the mass weddings of Fancy and Luis, Paloma and Noah, Miguel and Kay, and Edna and Norma (the first gay couple ever to go down the aisle on a soap opera), and Gwen and Rebecca being exposed for their crimes as Theresa and Ethan finally married.

Sexual violence
Another recurring theme on Passions was sexual violence. Many storylines, from 2005 until the series’ end, included rape as a plot point.

In 2005, Paloma Lopez-Fitzgerald was sexually assaulted and nearly raped during a club raid. The show then carried a plotline over whether they should do a rape test while Paloma was in a coma (at the time she was a virgin) and Jessica Bennett was also raped a few weeks later while at a club. Also early in the year, Alistair Crane repeatedly raped his wife, Katherine Crane, while at the Crane Compound. Late in May, heiress Fancy Crane was nearly raped by a man in Las Vegas who demanded "payment" for letting her into a party after she lost her invitation. During the tsunami and later in November, Liz Sanbourne attempted to rape Julian Crane at knife point. In August, Theresa Lopez-Fitzgerald was raped by Alistair Crane when she refused to pay him (with sex) for helping her with visitation of her infant daughter, Jane; Theresa later married Alistair, and he continued to rape her throughout their marriage. Also in August or September, Kay Bennett was attacked by a gang of men while walking through the park at night, though Fox Crane soon arrived and the two defeated the group. Liz Sanbourne also revealed during the tsunami that Julian Crane had raped her in Boston many years previously (she later revealed that it had been Alistair who had done the deed, thus producing a son, Chad Harris-Crane).

The most prominent rape storyline began in December 2006, when Crane heiress and police cadet Fancy Crane was raped during a sting operation designed to catch a peeping tom. The brutal attack left Fancy in a brief coma and emotionally traumatized the young woman. Fancy was also the show's first rape victim to visibly experience prolonged effects; her bubbly demeanor disappeared, and she became extremely nervous and could not stand to be touched for several months. Fancy was eventually raped for a second time in January 2007, and her boyfriend, Luis Lopez-Fitzgerald, was framed for the crimes; the rapist was later revealed to be Vincent Clarkson, Fancy's paternal half-brother through their father.

Rape also played prominently into the 2007—2008 storyline involving Mexican drug cartel leader Juanita Vasquez. Sometime between the births of Pilar's second and third children, the Lopez-Fitzgerald matriarch returned to her native Mexico to visit with her childhood best friend, Juanita Vasquez. There, she discovered that Juanita's husband, Carlos, was still involved with his family's drug cartel and was planning a hit on a rival family; when Pilar confronted Carlos, he raped her, and she accidentally killed him in self-defense. Pilar then called the police in an attempt to stop the hit, but the police ended up murdering the entire Vasquez family, including Juanita and Carlos' young children, except for Juanita. Juanita refused to believe that her husband had raped Pilar and made it her life's mission to murder Pilar's entire family, eventually murdering Pilar's sister and two nephews.

Men on the show were equally as likely to be violated as women. Fox Crane, Julian Crane, and Luis Lopez-Fitzgerald have all been victims of sexual assault.

Eerie deaths
One unfortunate trademark for Passions has been eerie deaths. In 2002, Josh Ryan Evans, who played Tabitha's doll sidekick Timmy, died while on medical leave, just as scenes were airing where Timmy died in the hospital and went to Heaven. Passions had planned to revive the character in a few months once Evans returned from his own surgery, but instead had to write Timmy out. After five years of evil Crane patriarch Alistair being heard but never having his face seen (voiced by Alan Oppenheimer), Passions cast the role with longtime daytime veteran David Bailey. Bailey was a hit with the cast as well as the fans, but on Thanksgiving Day 2004, Bailey drowned in his pool, just as scenes were airing where various characters tried to kill Alistair, who actually suffered clinical death before being magically revived by Tabitha. Again, the viewers and the producers were stunned, but the show had no choice but to recast the pivotal role (with John Reilly).

Breaking the fourth wall
With its humor and occasional tongue-in-cheek tone, Passions has been known to "break the fourth wall", or somehow call attention to the fact that the show is fictional. In an early episode, Kay, Simone, and Zombie Charity were seen actually watching Passions, and when the television in the Bennett's kitchen covered what would have been Theresa's execution, the news report actually pre-empted Passions, cutting in during the theme song just after the appearance of the logo. In a 2002 episode Theresa was giving birth while stuck in a cabin with Ethan and Gwen; she had a hallucination in which the three of them did a dance together and sang the show's theme song "Breathe." In a 2004 episode, TC commented on "that crazy soap after Days of our Lives", referring to Passions itself. In a 2005 episode, Fancy Crane used a magazine to hide her face from Noah; the magazine had an image of the then-unrevealed Rachel Barrett with the sentence "Who is she?" under the Passions logo. In the same episode, Fancy later commented that "soaps are like life; you never know what's going to happen next!" In an early 2006 episode, Ivy and assistant Valerie were searching on the internet for Miguel to bring him back to Harmony and interfere with Fox and Kay's relationship. They could not find him, but Valerie tracked down his last place of employment: he was last seen working as a gardener in some suburban town on a street called Wisteria Lane. At that time, Jesse Metcalfe (ex-Miguel) was playing a gardener on the prime-time serial Desperate Housewives, which takes place on a street called Wisteria Lane. In the March 30, 2006 episode, while Passions reruns were airing on the Sci-Fi Channel, Simone compared life in Harmony to living in a show on the Sci-Fi Channel. Similarly, in the August 10, 2006 episode, Theresa commented that her office was not like an NBC daytime serial, and that she would not hire somebody just because he looked like Jesse Metcalfe (who had portrayed her brother Miguel from 1999 to 2004). A similar inside joke occurred when the character Fancy had a dream that she was a cheerleader; in real life, Fancy's portrayer Emily Harper was a "Laker Girl" (cheerleader for the Los Angeles Lakers) from 2000 to 2003.

In April 2007, Kay was watching the sixth  hour of The Today Show (an apparent jab at NBC's decision to extend it at the expense of the Passions timeslot) when it was interrupted with a news report that Luis had been arrested. In one August 2007 episode, Tabitha said that a certain soap opera was starting on DirecTV and she would have to tell her friends not to call her between the hours of 2:00 and 3:00 pm, blatantly referring to Passions itself. At the beginning of the show's final week on NBC, as Whitney was preparing to move to New Orleans, Theresa asked if she was sure she wanted to go, and Whitney commented that she had already arranged to have her DirecTV hooked up in Louisiana so she could "keep up on everything happening in Harmony." And also in 2007, Endora flat-out made a reference to the "audience" in one of her thought balloons, prompting Norma to look in the camera and respond, "Audience? What audience?" Endora also pointed out in one of her thought balloons that when Miguel returned to Passions, he looked nothing like Jesse Metcalfe ("Nope, not even close!"). In May 2008 while Juanita was looking for clues in a bookstore as to where Pilar was, the bargain shelf was full of copies of Hidden Passions. In  June 2008, Tabitha mentions the fourth hour of Today being a ratings-grabber, poking fun as to how they canceled the soap making way for this fourth hour trying to bring the ratings on NBC up.
In the June 30, 2008, episode, Sheridan mentions Pretty's fake scar with references to her real family the Westmores. Michael Westmore did make up for all four Star Trek spin-off series.

In the July 30, 2008, episode, Tabitha tells Endora about the volcano in Harmony referring to it as how Passions was canceled at the last moment and the actors not knowing. She tells Endora to look in the bowl and Endora says she sees a man sitting at a desk with the initials "J. Z." this is referring to NBC President Jeff Zucker. Tabitha looks at the audience mentioning Universal forces and Direct Intervention. This is a nod at both Universal Studios and DirecTV for canceling the series twice in one year.

Promotion and product placement
During its NBC run, Passions was known to "promote" other NBC programming within its storylines, and to incorporate commercial products into the plot in a promotional tactic known as product placement.

Shortly after Passions debuted, Campbell tomato soup was featured as an ingredient in Grace Bennett's tomato soup cake. Also, Nestlé Purina Dog Chow was used to feed Tabitha Lenox's pet cat Fluffy.

In a 2004 episode, TC watched an NBC ad for Days of Our Lives on his TV, and went on to praise the writers of Days of our Lives for coming up with such good storylines; Days, at that time, was under the helm of James E. Reilly, head writer of Passions. In the September 4, 2006, episode, Fox was sucked into a black hole; he then told Tabitha that it was the kind of black hole that one gets sucked into on the Sci Fi Channel, which was the channel on which Passions repeats aired in 2006. Tabitha then told him stick with NBC (Passions''' network). In an episode later in September 2006, Siren tried to get Miguel into bed by singing her Siren's song. Miguel told her that she should not audition for America's Got Talent, which airs on NBC. In another episode, Tabitha talked about The Biggest Loser season finale, which was also aired on NBC. A more recent episode featured characters watching a trailer for the 2007 Diane Keaton film Because I Said So (produced by Universal Studios, which, like NBC, is owned by General Electric).

For a time, Jessica Bennett was an Avon mark saleswoman, and more recently the show featured Johnson & Johnson's K-Y Jelly personal lubricant, and characters were seen drinking from Brita water pitchers. Both Jessica and Theresa were seen using Clearblue Easy pregnancy test products. After Kay and Miguel's wedding in 2008, Norma gave Miguel the 2-in-1 K-Y Jelly personal lubricant by Johnson & Johnson, telling him how it is so great for her and Edna and that Miguel and Kay will find great enjoyment in it.

In July 2007, Passions began to promote its own move to DirecTV for the following September. Several characters' homes were seen sporting DirecTV dishes on their roofs, and characters  began to make frequent references to switching to DirecTV.

Theme song and opening sequence
The theme song for Passions is titled "Breathe"; it was performed by Jane French and written by French and John Henry Kreitler. A long version of this theme was also released but was never used on the show.

The opening title sequence used since the show's premiere in 1999 features shots of the city of Harmony and its landmarks (actually the real-life town of Camden, Maine). The sequence opens and closes with the show's logo in an italic typeface and in an Arial Black typeface in generic caps posted in front of the cursive form of the title. The opening theme is sometimes shortened to the last two verses to fit in extra scene time.

Ratings and broadcasting history
United States
A replacement for the serial Another World (which ended on June 25, 1999 after a 35-year run) on NBC's daytime schedule, Passions debuted ahead of fellow NBC soap Sunset Beach with a 2.1 rating (1.9 million viewers) and remained there until Sunset Beach was cancelled in December 1999. From January 2000 until early May, the show came in last place in the ratings among the ten soaps on the air at the time. During May 2000 sweeps, Passions gained in popularity and pulled ahead of ABC's Port Charles. Passions remained ahead of Port Charles until the latter show's cancellation in October 2003. From then on, Passions once again was last in the American daytime ratings, where it would stay for virtually the rest of its run. It did top Guiding Light on occasion, but never for more than one week at a time. From 2001 to 2003, when Passions was at the peak of its popularity, it averaged a weekly 2.1-2.3 rating (roughly 2.4 million viewers). However, the ratings slowly declined each year afterwards; by the 2006-2007 season, the show averaged a 1.5 weekly rating (about 1.9 million viewers). The final episode on NBC had a household rating of 1.3/4 (1.68 million viewers). No ratings information was ever released for the show's run on DirecTV.

While Passions was never a big hit in household ratings, the show was a powerhouse in the younger-skewing demographics. For its entire NBC run it ranked as the #1 soap in Girls 12-17 and Women 18-24. The show also ranked #2 in Women 18-34 and even overtook fellow NBC soap Days of Our Lives for a short period during the 2004-2005 season. In the crucial 18-49 demographic, Passions usually ranked #7, ahead of CBS soaps As the World Turns, and Guiding Light. The highest ranking Passions ever achieved in the 18-49 demographic was 4th place in November 2002 and once again in January 2007. 

During its NBC run, Passions ran for 60 minutes every weekday (excluding some holidays). In the final NBC 2006-07 season, episodes were available online at NBC.com for free viewing and for purchase on iTunes. After the move to DirecTV, the schedule was shortened to four days a week (Monday through Thursday) plus weekend marathon encores, then later three days a week (Monday through Wednesday) starting in January 2008 until the finale. Initially, DirecTV episodes were only available on its own exclusive channel; later they were made available for a paid subscription fee at NBC.com.

CanadaPassions aired in Canada for its entire NBC run, first on CTV in 1999 and then on Global TV in 2000. The series lasted there until its final airdate on NBC in September 2007, at which time it was then succeeded by Guiding Light in the same time slot. NTV in Newfoundland and Labrador also aired Passions for almost its entire NBC run and was replaced by As the World Turns just before the series ended on NBC. On July 3, 2007 it was reported that new Canadian premium television service Super Channel would air the DirecTV episodes of Passions in Canada when the channel launched in October 2007. Those episodes premiered on Super Channel on October 8, 2007 (airing two new episodes at a time only until it caught up to the DirecTV episodes) and ran until the series finale on August 7, 2008. On August 11, 2008, Super Channel began to air Passions from the premiere episode. Season 2 re-ran on Super Channel starting August 2009 and season 3 in 2010. Season 4 premiered on July 14, 2011. Passions run on Super Channel ended on July 3, 2012. Super Channel chose not to renew their contract due to technical issues.

AustraliaPassions was broadcast nationally in Australia on the Seven Network each weekday at 3:00pm, beginning on 29 January 2001 with the series' 1999 episodes. In 2005, the series was moved to an earlier 9:30am time slot, before the show's international licensing was cancelled due to the music copyright fees. Passions then went into re-runs in a 2am weekday morning time-slot, before ultimately ending with a "series finale."

 Croatia 
In Croatia, private televizor Nova TV aired the first two seasons of the show (520 episodes). The show was well received by the public, but badly by the critics.

Awards and nominationsPassions has been honored with numerous awards and nominations during its run, including Daytime Emmy Awards, Imagen Foundation Awards, and a GLAAD Media Award.

Critical reception
At its debut, reviews for the series were mixed. The Orlando Sentinel gave Passions a "bleak prognosis" regarding the Princess Diana controversy. Their critic wrote: "A show's dearth of creativity is evident when it shamelessly keeps picking over the bones of the dead. Passions seems to have a death wish." TIME magazine wrote that apart from the show's supernatural elements, "Passions would appear indistinguishable from almost any other soap opera." Unlike the Orlando Sentinel, Time approved of the Princess Diana link, stating that it showed that Passions was not "devoid of promise" and that the storyline showed "flashes of a certain kind of genius."

By 2001, Michael Logan of TV Guide remarked of Passions, "There hasn't been this sort of buzz about a soap since the Luke and Laura days on General Hospital...It's unlike anything else out there. There's a real sense of hipness to it."

Craig Tomashoff of The New York Times praised the campy storylines by calling Passions the "Twin Peaks of daytime": "It's a staggeringly psychotic blend of supernatural thriller, melodramatic soap opera and situation comedy, featuring acting that would make a pro wrestler blush. I'm never quite sure whether this is a laughing at or a laughing with kind of show; either way, I'm still laughing."

Cast

Contract cast members

Noted guest stars

In a nod to Bewitched, Bernard Fox appeared as that series' "Dr. Bombay" on Passions in 1999 and 2000. Alice Ghostley, who portrayed bumbling witch Esmeralda on Bewitched, also appeared on Passions in 2000 as the ghost of Matilda Matthews, a friend and rival witch from Tabitha's past in colonial New England. Comedian Ruth Buzzi portrayed Nurse Kravitz, an eccentric nurse who discovers that the character Endora has a demon tail, in 2003. Marla Gibbs appeared in 2004 and 2005 as Irma Johnson, the cantankerous aunt of Eve Russell and Liz Sanbourne. Gibbs was nominated for a NAACP Image Award for Outstanding Actress in a Daytime Drama Series for the role. From 2005 to 2006, Julia Duffy portrayed the Mother Superior at the convent to which Whitney Russell flees, and Georgia Engel played Esmeralda, Tabitha's childhood rival, in a 2007 Wicked-themed storyline.

Professional basketball player Robert Horry appeared as himself in 1999, as did singer Mýa in 2003 and the band Scissor Sisters in 2007. Judge Mablean Ephriam also portrayed herself in a 2003 fantasy sequence in which the character T. C. and Eve Russell go on the Divorce Court television program.

Juliet Mills' daughter Melissa Caulfield appeared in 1999 and 2005 as Nanny Phoebe Figalilly, a role played by Mills in the sitcom Nanny and the Professor. Gabby Tamargo, daughter of Eva Tamargo, portrayed a young version of the elder Tamargo's character, Pilar Lopez-Fitzgerald, in 2008.

Hidden Passions

In 2001, HarperEntertainment released Hidden Passions: Secrets from the Diaries of Tabitha Lenox, a tie-in novelization presented as Tabitha's diary, exposing the secrets and pasts of the town's residents. Passions featured a storyline involving Tabitha and Timmy promoting the book, which reached #4 on the real-life New York Times Best Seller list and garnered the series two alternative covers of TV Guide'' in July 2001. While the novel was billed as being canonical, by the show's final episode, the televised canon had diverged significantly from the novel since its publication.

See also
 List of Passions awards
 List of Passions characters
 List of Passions crew
 List of American daytime soap opera ratings

References

External links
 
 

1990s American drama television series
1999 American television series debuts
2000s American drama television series
2007 American television series debuts
2007 American television series endings
2008 American television series endings
American fantasy television series
American television series revived after cancellation
American television soap operas
Audience (TV network) original programming
English-language television shows
NBC network soap operas
NBC original programming
Television shows set in New England
 
Rape in television
Television series about dysfunctional families
Television series by Universal Television
Television shows set in Maine
Witchcraft in television